The Marquez vs. Katsidis boxing match was considered to be one of the best fights of 2010. Marquez had slowed to the point that he almost seemed to prefer getting into slugfests where he could still use his excellent counter-punching accuracy, while Katsidis had never been one to turn down a blood-drenched war.

Background
Lightweight champion Juan Manuel Marquez agreed to fight Michael Katsidis at the MGM Grand Garden Arena on the Las Vegas Strip on Nov. 27. Marquez (51-5-1, 37 KOs) had decisively won a rematch with Juan Diaz on July 31 in his first fight since losing to Floyd Mayweather Jr. in their 2009 bout. After failing to interest Manny Pacquiao in a third fight, Marquez agreed to a mandatory title defense against Michael Katsidis (27-2, 22 KOs), who had revitalized his career with four straight victories following back-to-back losses to Joel Casamayor and Juan Diaz.

There was speculation that the fight was going to be postponed because the brother of Katsidis was found dead on October 19, 2010 in his Brisbane, Australia home. Katsidis was out for a run when Smith received a call from Katsidis' mother. She had bad news. Katsidis' older brother, Stathi Katsidis, had been found dead of a possible drug overdose in his Brisbane home by girlfriend Melissa Jackson. Things are back to planned, and he  would indeed challenge Marquez, despite the death of his older brother, Stathi Katsidis.

After Manny Pacquiao's beating of Antonio Margarito there were many speculated opponents. One that stood out was a rubber match between Marquez and Pacquiao (if he gets through Katsidis). Pacquiao plans to retire before the age of 35, he told a news conference in Manila.  He said he was willing to fight Marquez again but that the match would probably not excite fans. "I would not watch Pacquiao vs. Marquez," he said. Though Marquez would have to go up to Welterweight (2 weight classes up) to challenge, Pacquiao would outweigh Marquez by no more than around 3 lbs on the night of the fight; Marquez rehydrated to 145 lbs vs. Katsidis, while Pacquiao rehydrated to 148 lbs vs. Margarito.

The fight
Dinamita successfully defended his WBA and WBO lightweight titles, stopping Katsidis at 2:14 in the ninth round. Katsidis knocked down Marquez with a left hook in the third round, but Marquez rallied to take the lead before finishing off Katsidis in the ninth round.

In the ninth round, Marquez landed 36 punches to nine for Katsidis, Kenny Bayless halted the bout after Katsidis was hurt by several combinations. After eight rounds, the three judges had the 37-year-old Marquez leading, 78-74, 76-75, 77-74.

Fight earnings
 Juan Manuel Márquez $1,400,000  vs. Michael Katsidis $530,000
 Andre Berto $1,250,000 vs. Freddy Hernandez

Undercard

Televised
 Lightweight Championship bout: Juan Manuel Márquez(c)   vs.  Michael Katsidis 
 Márquez defeats Katsidis via TKO at 2:14 of round 9. 
 Welterweight Championship bout:  Andre Berto(c)   vs  Freddy Hernandez
 Berto defeats Hernandez via TKO at 2:07 of round 1. 
 Super Featherweight bout:  Celestino Caballero vs.  Jason Litzau
 Litzau defeats Caballero via split decision (97-93,96-94, 94-96).

Untelevised
 Light Middleweight bout:  Erislandy Lara vs. Tim Connors
 Lara defeats Connors via TKO at 1:38 of round 1.
 Light Welterweight bout:  Nate Campbell vs.  Walter Estrada
 Estrada defeats Campbell via split decision (77-74, 77-74, and 75-76).
 Light Middleweight bout:  Keith Thurman vs. Favio Medina
 Thurman defeats Medina via TKO at 2:34 of round 4.
 Super Middleweight bout:  Bastie Samir vs.  Billy Cunningham
 Samir defeats Cunningham via TKO at 1:56 of round 2.
 Welterweight bout:  Michael Finney vs. Clayvonne Howard
 Finney defeats Howard via TKO at 1:26 of round 2.

External links
 Marquez vs. Katsidis Official Fight Card from BoxRec

References

Boxing matches
2010 in boxing
Boxing in Las Vegas
2010 in sports in Nevada
Boxing on HBO
Golden Boy Promotions
November 2010 sports events in the United States
MGM Grand Garden Arena